Major Richard Gabriel Akinwande Savage (1903–1993) was a physician, soldier, and the first person of West African heritage to receive a British Army commission.

Early life and family
He was born in 1903 at 15 Buccleugh Place, in Edinburgh, Scotland, of mixed ancestry to the prominent Nigerian doctor Richard Akinwande Savage of Sierra Leone Creole descent, who married a Scotswoman, Maggie Bowie. His sister, Agnes Yewande Savage, also played a pioneering role as the first West African woman to qualify as a medical doctor.

Education
Savage studied medicine at the University of Edinburgh, graduated (MB, ChB) in 1926, qualified in 1927, and received his commission as a 2nd lieutenant on 23 September 1940, making him the first West African to be commissioned an officer in the British Army (Seth Anthony of Ghana, has been incorrectly referenced as the first West African to receive a commission in the British Army). In September 1941, Savage was promoted to the rank of captain. He served as a medical doctor in the Asian Theater of World War II, specifically in Burma, where he tended to wounded soldiers from Britain's contingent. Among the soldiers that Savage treated in Burma was Isaac Fadoyebo, a wounded Nigerian soldier in the Royal West African Frontier Force, who recounted the quality of care that Savage provided to him and other West African soldiers.

Later life
He, like his father, also married a Scottish woman. He retired to Scotland, having found Africa "vexing", and died there in 1993.

References

1903 births
1993 deaths
British Army personnel of World War II
Nigerian people of World War II
Yoruba military personnel
Yoruba physicians
Alumni of the University of Edinburgh
Scottish people of Sierra Leonean descent
20th-century Nigerian medical doctors
Scottish people of Nigerian descent
Scottish people of Yoruba descent
Scottish military medical officers
Nigerian military doctors
Medical doctors from Edinburgh
Royal Army Medical Corps officers
Richard
Nigerian people of Scottish descent
20th-century Scottish medical doctors